, born 4 March 1986, is the stage name of a Japanese J-Pop and R&B singer.

Born  in Saitama Prefecture, she began her career in 2009 when she signed with the music company Universal Music Japan her first recording contract.

Biography 
Masaki played since middle school to high school as a handball player in her school club, being even selected in the U-16 Junior Team of Japan. After high school she attended a music school in Tokyo, where she became interested in African-American music.

After her graduation, she took her first steps as a singer performing in clubs and concert halls in Tokyo. With an average of ten appearances per month Masaki attracted attention from Japanese and even Korean record companies, until she finally signed her contract with Universal Music Japan.

On 16 February 2011, she released her first single, "Last Kiss", a duet with the Japanese singer KG.

Discography

Albums 
 [2011.09.21] - Love Space 
 [2012.08.08] - Tears of Heart

Singles 
 [2011.02.16] Last Kiss feat.  (#19 RIAJ, #90 Oricon Chart) 
 [2011.04.27] Motto Aishitakatta (もっと愛したかった; I Wanted to Love You More) (#13 RIAJ, #113 Oricon Chart)
 [2011.07.20] Lady Luck
 [2011.08.17] Change Myself (#147 Oricon Chart)
 [2012.03.14] Negai feat. K.J. 
 [2012.07.04] Sweet Pain feat. Shion

References

External links 
 

1986 births
Living people
Musicians from Saitama Prefecture
21st-century Japanese singers
21st-century Japanese women singers